Alchemilla vulgaris, common name Lady's mantle, is an herbaceous perennial plant in Europe and Greenland.  These perennial wildflowers, members of the rose family, are sometimes grown in gardens - mainly for their leaves, which collect sparkling water droplets.

Lady's mantle is commonly seen in unimproved or lightly fertilized grassland, on roadside verges and banks, in chalk downland and on mountain slopes.

Synonyms:
 Alchemilla acutangula Buser
 Alchemilla acutiloba Opiz
 Alchemilla latifolia Salisb.
 Alchemilla pontica (Buser) K.Malý
 Potentilla acutiloba (Opiz) Christenh. & Väre

Identification 
The distinctively corrugated and lobed (5 to 11 lobes with the upper leaves having fewer) kidney-shaped to semicircular leaves of Alchemilla make identification to genus level fairly straightforward.

The yellowish-green flowers form clusters. Each individual flower is typically 3mm in diameter, with no true petals but a four-lobed epicalyx, four sepals and usually four but sometimes five stamens.

In Britain and Ireland the tiny flowers of Alchemilla vulgaris can be seen from June through to September.

Alchemilla mollis, a rather larger species but otherwise very similar, is quite a common garden escape that sometimes appears in hedgerows and on unkempt grassland.

Other common names for Lady's Mantle are Nine Hooks, Bear's Foot, or Lion's Foot.

Species interactions
Alchemilla vulgaris is a known host to a least three species of fungi, Coleroa alchemillae, Phoma herbarum and Ramularia aplospora.

References 

vulgaris
Plants described in 1753
Taxa named by Carl Linnaeus